Énée et Lavinie (Aeneas and Lavinia) is an opera by the French composer Pascal Collasse, first performed at the Académie Royale de Musique (the Paris Opéra) on 7 November 1690. It takes the form of a tragédie lyrique in a prologue and five acts.

The libretto, by Bernard Le Bovier de Fontenelle, is based on the later books of Virgil's Aeneid. A new setting by the composer Antoine Dauvergne appeared in 1758.

Roles

Synopsis
Aeneas, fleeing the destruction of Troy, has arrived in Latium in Italy. The King of Latium wants to marry his daughter Lavinia to Aeneas, but the Trojan has a rival in the local prince Turnus, who is favoured by the queen and the goddess Juno. Juno provokes Turnus to fight the Trojans. The king consults the oracle of his father, the god Faunus, who says that Lavinia must choose her husband for herself and then there will be peace. The ghost of Dido warns Lavinia not to trust her faithless lover Aeneas. The god Bacchus also inspires Lavinia with a hatred of the Trojans and she announces she will marry Turnus. Aeneas reproaches her for her choice and tells her he only abandoned Dido because the god Jupiter told him to. Lavinia admits she loathes Turnus and was only persuaded to marry him by a divine fury sent by Bacchus. Turnus arrives and Aeneas challenges him to single combat. Turnus accepts. The goddess Venus brings Aeneas special armour. Aeneas and Turnus fight (offstage) and Aeneas is victorious. Juno renounces her hatred for the Trojans and the opera ends with the wedding of Aeneas and Lavinia.

References
Notes

Sources
 Félix Clément and Pierre Larousse Dictionnaire des Opéras, Paris, 1881
 Libretto at "Livrets baroques"

Operas
Tragédies en musique
French-language operas
1690 operas
Operas by Pascal Collasse
Operas based on the Aeneid